La Belette may refer to:
 a lieu-dit in Ledringhem, Nord, France
 La Belette (comic), a 1983 comic by Belgian artist Didier Comès

See also
 Belette (disambiguation)